is a Japanese actor.

Nakao's wife is actress Riisa Naka, his co-star in Time Traveller: The Girl Who Leapt Through Time.

Filmography

Television

Films

Bibliography

Photo albums

Novels

References

External links 

 – Horipro 
 – Ameba Blog 
 – Line Blog 

Japanese male child actors
Japanese male voice actors
1988 births
Living people
Horipro artists
Male actors from Tokyo